Standup in Stilettos is an American stand-up comedy show that aired on the TV Guide Network and was presented by Kate Flannery. It was the first all-women stand-up comedy show to air on a US television network. The series premiered on June 16, 2012 and ran for two seasons.

Premise 
Each episode had three female comedians performing. This included upcoming and practiced comedians, as well as comedic actresses. The comedy routines were chosen to be for and by women.

With the show Flannery wanted to introduce a new audience to talented female comedians.

Episodes

Series overview

Season 1 (2012)

Season 2 (2012)

References

External links
 Full Episodes Currently on PopTV.com (Pop Media Group LLC, a ViacomCBS company)
 About StandUp In Stilettos at TVGN
 Huffington Post "Kate Flannery On 'StandUp In Stilettos': 'The Girls Can Play Just As Hard As The Boys'"
 

2010s American stand-up comedy television series
2012 American television series debuts
2012 American television series endings
Pop (American TV channel) original programming